Ya'ara (lit. honeysuckle and honeycomb) is a moshav in northern Israel. Located near Ma'alot-Tarshiha, it falls under the jurisdiction of Ma'ale Yosef Regional Council.

History
The village was established in 1950 on land that had belonged to the depopulated Palestinian village of Arab al-Samniyya by immigrants from Yemen, who were later joined by Jewish immigrants from North Africa and local Bedouin, and was the first mixed Jewish-Bedouin village in the country. It was named after the surrounding forests.

References

Bedouin localities in Israel
Moshavim
Populated places established in 1950
Populated places in Northern District (Israel)
1950 establishments in Israel
North African-Jewish culture in Israel
Yemeni-Jewish culture in Israel